La Florida Airport may refer to:

La Florida Airport (Chile) in La Serena, Chile
La Florida Airport (Colombia) in Tumaco, Colombia